The Leeds municipal elections were held on Thursday 11 May 1967, with one third of the council up for election as well as vacancies in the wards of Woodhouse and Wortley.

The final election on present boundaries, the Conservatives won a decisive victory on a 3.8% swing to a record share and their highest vote in over fifteen years. The Tories picked up five seats in total from Labour, and for the first time since 1951, won their second seat in the wards of Kirkstall, Stanningley and Westfield, and gained full representation in Bramley and Wortley. With those gains the Conservatives now had a narrow lead in councillors, with only Labour's superior aldermen totals stopping the Tories from gaining the council and adding it to the list of momentous victories that night.

Elsewhere the Liberals seen yet another fall in their vote, returning their third place to contention as the Communists continued inching upwards, comfortably achieving their greatest vote. Last year's British National candidate stood again in Armley, but this time as a National Front candidate and an Independent contested Bramley. Turnout rose dramatically following the previous year's poor figure to 39.2%, the best participation seen since 1955.

Election result

The result had the following consequences for the total number of seats on the council after the elections:

Ward results

References

1967 English local elections
1967
1960s in Leeds